Dương Quỳnh Hoa (1930-2006) was a notable member of the National Liberation Front in South Vietnam during the Vietnam War and a member of its provisionary government, serving as a cabinet member.

Early years 

Born in 1930, Hoa was from a southern upper-class family, which had been Frenchified during the colonial era. After completing her secondary schooling in Vietnam, she moved to Paris in the 1950s, where she became a communist. Upon finishing her degree, she returned to southern Vietnam, which following the partition of Vietnam following the Battle of Dien Bien Phu and the Geneva Conference had become part of the anti-communist Republic of Vietnam. During this period of the late 1950s and early 1960s, Hoa spied for the communists, as she socialised with the Saigon elite at cocktail parties with the inner circle of President Ngo Dinh Diem and the American advisors in Vietnam, who were oblivious to the fact that the upper-class southerner was a communist.

During this time, she was a founding member of the National Front for the Liberation of South Vietnam, popularly known as the Viet Cong, which was formed in 1960.

War time activities 

Early in 1968 when the Tet Offensive broke out, Hoa and her husband, a mathematician, fled Saigon to a Vietcong hideout in the jungle. There, the couple's son died of encephalitis. Although she never recovered from the personal loss, she put on a brave face in an interview with American journalist Stanley Karnow, quipping that her son was "only one among millions".

She was appointed as the Vietcong's deputy minister of health in its Provisional Revolutionary Government, a body that was set up at the order of North Vietnam to give the Vietcong political legitimacy. She was named as a "heroine of the revolution. Of her involvement with the Vietcong, she said in 1981, "We had no choice. We had to get rid of the foreigners."

Critic of communism 

Following the war she administered a children's hospital in the newly renamed Ho Chi Minh City.

After the communist takeover, Hoa eventually became a vocal critic of communist rule. She stated "I have been a communist all my life, but now I've seen the realities of Communism, and it is a failure — mismanagement, corruption, privilege, repression. My ideals are gone."

Hoa also attacked the cadres who later moved into the south after the reunification and dominated the communist ruling class, who she felt were inattentive to southern regional characteristics and sensitivities. She was particularly critical of the forced land collectivisation programs, noting that some southern peasants went to the Vietcong due to their policy of land reform, whereas the South Vietnam had been proponents of land policies that were favourable to the landed gentry. Of the northerners who ruled over the south, she expressed her contempt, saying that "They behave as though they conquered us." At the time, the failure of the rice harvest and declining food rations had seen record levels of malnutrition at the hospital that she ran.

In 1990, she declared to Karnow that "Communism has been catastrophic. Party officials have never understood the need for rational development. They've been hypnotized by Marxist slogans that have lost validity — if they were ever valid. They are outrageous." Talking of the corruption practiced by the communist officials and their wives, she said that it was equivalent to what occurred in South Vietnam:"This is very much a feudal society, whatever its ideological veneer."

Notes

References

External links

"Bác sĩ Dương Quỳnh Hoa qua đời", BBC, 28 Feb. 2006.

1930 births
2006 deaths
Vietnamese communists
Vietnamese anti-communists
Government ministers of Vietnam
20th-century Vietnamese women politicians
20th-century Vietnamese politicians
Women government ministers of Vietnam
Former Marxists